Tele 9 Corazón (Spanish: "Tele 9 Heart") was a Colombian local state-run television channel, whose signal only reached Bogotá and was broadcast on Channel 9. It replaced privately owned Teletigre.

The Colombian state gave time slots for programming on Tele 9 Corazón to companies RTI, Punch, Caracol TV, Protón, Alberto Dangond Uribe, Eduardo Ruiz Martínez, Jorge Barón, and Alberto Acosta, among others.

In 1973, Tele 9 Corazón was replaced by Segunda Cadena, which would become Colombia's second national television network. Bogotá would have a local channel again in 1997 when Canal Capital signed on.

External links
 El Tiempo, Fechas que marcaron la historia de la televisión en Colombia, 10 June 2004

Defunct television channels
Television channels and stations established in 1971
Television channels and stations disestablished in 1972
Television stations in Colombia
Spanish-language television stations
Mass media in Bogotá